Lee Gordon McKillop (born 4 August 1968), known by his stage name Lee Mack, is an English comedian, actor, podcaster and presenter. He is known for his quick wit, writing and starring in the sitcom Not Going Out, being a team captain on the BBC One comedy panel show Would I Lie to You?, hosting the Sky One panel show Duck Quacks Don't Echo, presenting the panel show They Think It's All Over, and hosting Freeze the Fear with Wim Hof (2022–) alongside Holly Willoughby. He has also been a guest host on Have I Got News for You and Never Mind the Buzzcocks, a guest captain on 8 Out of 10 Cats Does Countdown, and a guest panellist on QI. In 2021 he made his debut on the BBC Radio 4 panel game I'm Sorry I Haven't a Clue. In 2022 he began hosting the ITV game show The 1% Club.

Early life
Mack was born on 4 August 1968 in Southport, now a part of Merseyside. He lived above a pub until he was 12, when his parents separated. He went to Birkdale Primary Junior School (Bury Road), Stanley High School in Southport, and Everton High School in Blackburn. On leaving school, Mack worked in a bingo hall and as a stable boy. After working at the stable of racehorse trainer Ginger McCain in Southport for three days, he asked if he could ride one of the horses, to which the trainer agreed. Without realising, Mack then chose Red Rum as the first horse he would ride.

Mack then became a Bluecoat entertainer at the Pontins holiday resort at Hemsby in Norfolk. He was sacked after appearing on stage drunk one night, forgetting a joke and insulting an audience member. He then worked for six months at Pontins in Morecambe.

Mack went on to have various other jobs, and performed his first "open mic" slot in 1994, while studying at Brunel University, from where he graduated with a degree in Drama. Within 18 months he was a full-time comedian.

Career
Mack first came to prominence by winning So You Think You're Funny at the 1995 Edinburgh Festival Fringe. Five years later at the festival, he was nominated for the Perrier Award Main Prize for his sketch comedy show, Lee Mack's New Bits, with Catherine Tate and Dan Antopolski. Since then, Mack has played the part of Graham, the security guard in the original radio version of The Mighty Boosh, and also has his own radio show on BBC Radio 2 called The Lee Mack Show, which features varying celebrities co-hosting the show.

Television
Mack was a cast member for ITV's The Sketch Show and featured in the American show of the same name.

In 2005, Mack presented They Think It's All Over, a sports-based comedy panel game, formerly presented by Nick Hancock. However, it proved to be the show's final series. In 2007 he appeared on TV Heaven, Telly Hell.

His first sitcom Not Going Out for BBC One with Tim Vine (in which he plays Lee, the leading man) premiered on 6 October 2006. The show has since returned for eleven more seasons, the most recent airing in 2023. The show has won a Rose d'Or and RTS Award.

Since 2007 Mack has been a team captain on the BBC One comedy panel show Would I Lie to You?. He has also been guest host on Have I Got News for You six times, and was twice guest host on Never Mind the Buzzcocks.

Mack has appeared on Live at the Apollo and 8 out of 10 Cats Does Countdown, where he is the current Carrot in a Box champion.

In June 2011, Mack launched a new show, Lee Mack's All Star Cast, for BBC One. It features members of the audience taking part in silly games to get a spot in a sketch at the end of the show. In June 2012, Mack was one of the compères at Queen Elizabeth II's Diamond Jubilee Concert outside Buckingham Palace in London, introducing Cliff Richard, Ed Sheeran, and Madness.

In March 2013, Mack appeared on the panel on an episode of Let's Dance for Comic Relief with Arlene Phillips and Greg James.

From 2014 to 2017, Mack presented Duck Quacks Don't Echo, a comedy-based panel show for Sky1, with various celebrity guests.

In 2018, Mack appeared in the Doctor Who episode "Kerblam!".

In June 2020, Mack announced his new sitcom, Semi-Detached. He was also set to host a reality show named The Chop: Britain's Best Woodworker for Sky History. However, the show was suspended shortly after its debut in October 2020, after allegations emerged that one of the series' contestants, promoted through the channel's social media pages, bore facial tattoos resembling Nazi symbolism. Semi-Detached was cancelled after one season.

Mack was on series 11 of Taskmaster, which started broadcast in March 2021.

Mack is currently presenting two new shows in 2022: Freeze the Fear with Wim Hof on BBC One - alongside Holly Willoughby and Wim Hof, and The 1% Club, on ITV. The 1% Club was renewed for a second series.

In June 2022, Mack was one of the compères at the Queen's Platinum Jubilee Platinum Party at the Palace, introducing Jax Jones and Diana Ross.

On 8 November 2022, it was announced that he would be hosting that year's Royal Variety Performance at the Royal Albert Hall.

Podcast
Mack has long had an interest in Buddhism, mindfulness and the possibility of leading a more spiritual life. Since September 2020 he has hosted a podcast on Buddhism and mindfulness with Neil Webster called I Can't Believe It's Not Buddha.

Stand-up

Career
Mack went on tour in 2006 and filmed his first live DVD at the Bloomsbury Theatre, which was released the following year. In spring 2010 Mack embarked on his "Going Out" tour. Extra dates were added for autumn 2010 due to his spring tour being sold out well in advance. Going Out Live, his second live DVD, was filmed at the Hammersmith Apollo and was released in November. In December 2010 he performed at the Royal Variety Performance.

In 2010, Mack took part in Channel 4's Comedy Gala, a benefit show held in aid of Great Ormond Street Children's Hospital, filmed live at the O2 Arena in London on 30 March.

Solo tours

Group tours

Personal life
Mack met Tara Mckillop during his time studying at Brunel University in 1996. They married in 2005, and they live in East Molesey, Surrey with their three children,  including their son, Arlo, who briefly appeared in the 2013 Christmas special of Not Going Out. He is a vegan. Mack is of distant part Irish descent, which was explored in the 2018 season of the British television programme, Who Do You Think You Are? While on the show, Mack found that his great-grandfather was a jobbing comic named William Alexander McKillop, who used the stage name Billy Mac. He also learned that his grandfather Joe was born in Southport, but was brought to Ireland as a baby and brought up by his grandparents in Ballina, County Mayo.

In February 2009, Mack, along with other British entertainers, signed an open letter to The Times regarding the Baháʼí Faith leaders then on trial in Iran.

Mack said in an interview with The Guardian that his first foray into comedy was doing Bobby Ball impressions at his school when he was 15. Ball would go on to play Mack's father, Frank in Not Going Out. Mack is a keen supporter of Blackburn Rovers and occasionally visits Ewood Park to watch games. At one point, he shared a flat with Noel Fielding.

In July 2012, Mack received an honorary doctorate from Brunel University. He published his autobiography Mack the Life.

Mack is a darts fan, and regularly plays with his friend and former Not Going Out co-star, Tim Vine. Both men appeared on the debut series of Let's Play Darts, facing each other in the final, with Mack and his partner Martin Adams beating Vine and his partner Darryl Fitton. Mack held two Guinness World Records titles relating to darts. The first was for the most darts number twos in one minute, which stood until 19 November 2020 when Ricky Evans broke the record with a total of 25. Mack had also, on the same day of the first record, broken the record for the most darts in inner and outer bullseyes in one minute; that title was held for a year and two months, before it was broken on 23 September 2016 by professional darts player James Wade.

In a 2015 interview with The Big Issue, Mack stated that he adheres to "left-of-centre" political leanings.

Mack has been alcohol-free since 2016, and is an ambassador for Alcohol Concern.

Mack has a phobia of flying, and travels by himself to holiday destinations. He travelled by train to Barcelona. He went around the world for Children in Need in 2009 with some other celebrities; however, he and Frank Skinner did not fly to Turkey. Mack said because the day he went home was his wife's birthday, he could not get the train back. He went on a flying course, which briefly helped for the flight home; however, he has not been on another plane since.

Mack has taken part in several Soccer Aid matches to raise money for UNICEF. In September 2021, he scored for the first time, in a year that he played for the World XI team, due to his Irish heritage of his great-grandmother. On 12 June 2022, Mack returned for the following game at the London Stadium, and scored the winning penalty for the World XI after a 2–2 draw in normal time.

Filmography
Film

Television

Stand-up DVDs

Awards and nominations

BAFTA TV Awards

|-
| 2002 || The Sketch Show || Best Comedy Programme or Series || 
|-
| 2019 || rowspan=2|Lee Mack for Would I Lie to You? || rowspan=2|Best Entertainment Performance || 
|-
| 2020 || 

British Comedy Awards

|-
| 2001 || Lee Mack for The Sketch Show || Best Comedy Newcomer || 
|-
| 2006 || Lee Mack || Best Live Stand Up Tour || 
|-
| rowspan=2|2007 || Lee Mack for Not Going Out || Best TV Comedy Actor || 
|-
| Not Going Out || Best New TV Comedy || 
|-
| rowspan=2|2012 || rowspan=2|Lee Mack || Best Male Television Comic || 
|-
| King or Queen of Comedy || 
|-
|rowspan=2|2013 || rowspan=2|Lee Mack || Best Male Television Comic || 
|-
| King or Queen of Comedy || 
|-
|rowspan=3|2014 || rowspan=2|Lee Mack || Best Male Television Comic || 
|-
| King or Queen of Comedy || 
|-
|Lee Mack for Would I Lie to You? || Best Comedy Moment || 

RTS Television Awards

|-
| 2007 || Not Going Out || Breakthrough Award – Behind The Screen || 

Rose d'Or

|-
| 2007 || Not Going Out || Sitcom ||

References

External links

Official Tour website

I Can't Believe It's Not Buddha podcast

1968 births
Living people
20th-century English comedians
20th-century English male actors
20th-century English male writers
20th-century English writers
21st-century English comedians
21st-century English male actors
21st-century English male writers
21st-century English writers
Alumni of Brunel University London
Best Entertainment Performance BAFTA Award (television) winners
Comedians from Lancashire
English autobiographers
English male television actors
English stand-up comedians
Male actors from Lancashire
People from Southport
English people of Irish descent